Since 2014, Hans Bertelsen from Venstre had been mayor of Morsø Municipality. In the last election, Venstre had won an absolute majority of seats.

In this election Hans Bertelsen would stand again. He would win re-election, after it was clear that Venstre would win 11 seats, and hold their absolute majority. The day following election night, a constitution was announced, that would give Hans Bertelsen a third term as mayor.

Electoral system
For elections to Danish municipalities, a number varying from 9 to 31 are chosen to be elected to the municipal council. The seats are then allocated using the D'Hondt method and a closed list proportional representation.
Morsø Municipality had 21 seats in 2021

Unlike in Danish General Elections, in elections to municipal councils, electoral alliances are allowed.

Electoral alliances  

Electoral Alliance 1

Electoral Alliance 2

Electoral Alliance 3

Results

Notes

References 

Morsø